Red Lion Square is a small square in Holborn, London. The square was laid out in 1684 by Nicholas Barbon, taking its name from the Red Lion Inn. According to some sources, the bodies of three regicides—Oliver Cromwell, John Bradshaw and Henry Ireton—were placed in a pit on the site of the square.

By 1720, it was a fashionable part of London: the eminent judge Sir Bernard Hale was a resident of Red Lion Square. The square was "beautified" pursuant to a 1737 Act of Parliament. In the 1860s, on the other hand, it had clearly become decidedly unfashionable: the writer Anthony Trollope in his novel Orley Farm (1862) humorously reassures his readers that one of his characters is perfectly respectable, despite living in Red Lion Square. The Metropolitan Public Gardens Association's landscape gardener Fanny Wilkinson laid it out as a public garden in 1885, and, in 1894, the trustees of the square passed the freehold to the MPGA, which, in turn, passed it to the London County Council free of cost.

Past residents 
A notable resident of the square was John Harrison, the world-renowned inventor of the marine chronometer, who lived at number 12, where he died in 1776. There is a blue plaque dedicated to him on the corner of Summit House.

At No. 3, in 1826 Charles Lamb was painted by Henry Mayer. At No 17, Dante Gabriel Rossetti lived in 1851. Also at No 17, William Morris, Edward Burne-Jones and Richard Watson Dixon lived from 1856 to 1859. No. 8 was a decorators shop run by Morris, Burne Jones and others from 1860 to 1865. No. 31 was the home of F. D. Maurice.

At 35 St. George's Mansions in the square, suffragette sisters Irene and Hilda Dallas had lived (and had evaded the 1911 census) in protest that women did not have a right to vote.

Modern state 
The centre-piece of the garden today is a statue by Ian Walters of Fenner Brockway, which was installed in 1986. There is also a memorial bust of Bertrand Russell. Conway Hall—which is the home of the South Place Ethical Society and the National Secular Society—opens on to the square. 

The square today is home to the Royal College of Anaesthetists. Lamb's Conduit Street is nearby and the nearest underground station is Holborn.

The first headquarters of Marshall, Faulkner & Co, which was founded by William Morris, was at 8 Red Lion Square.

At No 4 Parton Street, a cul-de-sac off the square subsequently obliterated by St Martin's College of Art in Southampton Row (later Central Saint Martins), a group of young writers, including Dylan Thomas, George Barker, David Gascoyne and John Pudney, gathered about the bookshop run by David Archer.

Protest 
On 15 June 1974 a meeting by the National Front in Conway Hall resulted in a protest by anti-fascist groups. The following disorder and police action left one student—Kevin Gately from the University of Warwick—dead.

References
Notes

Sources

 

Squares in the London Borough of Camden
Holborn
Garden squares in London